William Bottomley (4 June 1886 – 8 May 1958) was an English professional footballer who played as a wing half in the Football League for Manchester City and Oldham Athletic.

Career 
After beginning his career in non-League football, Bottomley joined Second Division club Oldham Athletic in 1907. After 13 appearances, he moved up to the First Division to join Manchester City in May 1908 and remained at Hyde Road for seven seasons, making 103 appearances and scoring two goals. He continued to guest for the club during the First World War.

Personal life 
Bottomley served as a private in the Army Service Corps during the First World War. He was twice married and had seven children. Bottomley served in the Home Guard during the Second World War.

Career statistics

Honours 
Manchester City
 Football League Second Division: 1909–10

References

English footballers
Manchester City F.C. players
Oldham Athletic A.F.C. players
English Football League players
People from Mossley
1886 births
1958 deaths
Association football wing halves
British Army personnel of World War I
Royal Army Service Corps soldiers